Kuzma Nikitovich Galitsky (24 October 189714 March 1973) was a Soviet army general who earned the title Hero of the Soviet Union.

Biography
Kuzma Galitsky was born on 24 October 1897 in the city of Taganrog into a worker's family. He studied at the Taganrog Boys Gymnasium, which he graduated from in 1912, and worked at the Taganrog Train Station's depot. Galitsky joined the Bolshevik Party in 1918.

During the German-Soviet War, he commanded the 24th Rifle Division and the 67th Rifle Corps. Starting in September 1942, he commanded the 3rd Shock Army (Soviet Union), and from November 1943 to May 1945 he commanded of the 11th Guards Army. General Galitsky's army finished the war in Eastern Prussia, in Königsberg (currently Kaliningrad), where he built the first memorial in the Soviet Union to soldiers who fell during the war.

He was elected to the Supreme Soviet of the Soviet Union, serving from 1946 to 1962, concurrently serving as the commanding officer of the Northern Group of Forces in 1955-1958 and the Transcaucasian Military District in 1958-1961.

He died in Moscow in 1973 and was buried at the Novodevichy Cemetery.

Awards
 Hero of the Soviet Union (with "Gold Star» № 5036)
 Four Orders of Lenin
 Order of the Red Banner, four times
 Order of Suvorov, 1st class
 Order of Kutuzov, 1st class
 Order of Bogdan Khmelnitsky (Soviet Union), 1st class
 Order of the Red Star
 Jubilee Medal "In Commemoration of the 100th Anniversary since the Birth of Vladimir Il'ich Lenin"
 Medal "For the Victory over Germany in the Great Patriotic War 1941–1945"
 Jubilee Medal "Twenty Years of Victory in the Great Patriotic War 1941-1945"
 Medal "For the Capture of Königsberg"
 Jubilee Medal "XX Years of the Workers' and Peasants' Red Army"
 Jubilee Medal "30 Years of the Soviet Army and Navy"
 Jubilee Medal "40 Years of the Armed Forces of the USSR"
 Jubilee Medal "50 Years of the Armed Forces of the USSR"

Bibliography (memoirs)
«Годы суровых испытаний. 1941 - 1944 (записки командующего армией)»— М.: Наука, 1973.
«В боях за Восточную Пруссию. Записки командующего 11-й гвардейской армией» — М.: Наука, 1970.

Commemoration
Streets in Taganrog and in Kaliningrad were named after General Galitsky.

External links and references

 Kuzma Galitsky at War Heroes web site

1897 births
1973 deaths
Military personnel from Taganrog
People from Don Host Oblast
Bolsheviks
Communist Party of the Soviet Union members
Heroes of the Soviet Union
Recipients of the Order of Lenin
Recipients of the Order of the Red Banner
Recipients of the Order of Kutuzov, 1st class
Recipients of the Order of Bogdan Khmelnitsky (Soviet Union), 1st class
Recipients of the Order of Suvorov, 1st class
Soviet military personnel of the Russian Civil War
Army generals (Soviet Union)
Soviet military personnel of World War II
Soviet politicians
Burials at Novodevichy Cemetery
Frunze Military Academy alumni